David Clarke is deputy vice-chancellor and Professor of Law at Bristol University.

Biography
Clark studied law at Queens' College Cambridge from 1968 to 1972, obtaining his BA degree in 1971 (MA 1974) and LLM in 1972. He became a Solicitor (Honours) of the Supreme Court in 1975, serving Articles of Clerkship with Andrew & Co, Solicitors of Lincoln and was an assistant solicitor to that firm until his appointment as lecturer in law at the University of Bristol in 1977.

Clark became a visiting lecturer in law at the University of Canterbury in New Zealand in 1985. Promoted reader in 1990, he was subsequently promoted to Professor of Law in the University of Bristol in 1995. He served as head of the Department of Law for three years from 1997 to 2000 and was dean of the Faculty of Law from 2001 to 2003 and dean of law in 2003–2004 on the merger of the Faculties of Social Sciences and Law. He was appointed a pro vice-chancellor in 2005, with responsibility for personnel and took up the newly established role of deputy vice-chancellor in 2008.

Clark has specialised in commercial property law and written extensively in the law of Landlord and Tenant and Commonhold. He was responsible for the Boundaries and Commonhold titles in Halsbury's Laws of England. Clark was a member of the Department of Constitutional Affairs Commonhold Consultation Group. He was also part a group advising the Law Commission on the reform of the law of easements and covenants. He is a co-editor of the Common Law World Review.

Since 1996, Clark has been a legal chairman for the Residential Property Tribunal Service (Rent Assessment Committees and Leasehold Valuation Tribunals) and was a consultant solicitor with Osborne Clarke from 1988 - 2009.

Clark was a school governor of Westbury Park Primary School in Bristol for four years and a Governor at Cotham School in Cotham for seven years, including a period as Chair of Governors.

Curriculum Vitae

Education 
 State Primary Schools and The Lincoln School, Lincoln 1961-1968
 Queens' College Cambridge, 1968–1972
 Bachelor of Arts, University of Cambridge, First Class, 1971. MA, 1975
 Master of Laws, University of Cambridge, First Class
 Admitted a Solicitor of the Supreme Court of Judicature 1975, with Honours

Employment history

Legal Practice 
Articles of Clerkship, then Assistant Solicitor, with Messrs Andrew & Co, Solicitors, Lincoln 1973-1977

University of Bristol 
 Lecturer in Law, 1977–1990
 Senior Lecturer in Law, 1990–1994
 Reader in Law, 1995–1996
 Professor of Law, 1995-continues
 Pro Vice-Chancellor, 2005–2008
 Deputy Vice-Chancellor, 2008-

Appointments

Visiting appointments 
 1985, Lecturer in Law, University of Canterbury, Christchurch, New Zealand
 Visiting Lecturer, SPACE, University of Hong Kong, 1986, and annually from 1995–2004, for 2 weeks a year
 1988–2009. Commercial property law consultant, Osborne Clarke, Solicitors, Bristol
 1997-continues. Legal Chairman Rent Assessment Committees and Leasehold Valuation Tribunals (Part-time)
 2000–2006, member of the Department of Constitutional Affairs Commonhold Consultation Groups, assessing and then monitoring the implementation of the new law of Commonhold
 2002–2010. One of two academic members of the advisory committee to the Law Commission on the reform of easements.

University appointments and contributions 

 Legal adviser - University of Bristol Union, 1980–1983
 Tutor for Postgraduate Admissions, Faculty of Law 1988-1989
 Non-professorial member of Senate1988-1993
 Tutor for Undergraduate Admissions, Faculty of Law 1990-1993
 Convenor of the Non Professorial Assembly, 1990–91
 Chair, Overseas Committee, 1991–1992
 Non-professorial representative of Senate on Council 1990-1993
 Member of Senate 1995-continues
 Head of Department of Law, 1997–2000
 Dean of the Faculty of Law, 2001–2003
 Chair, Travel to Work Group (TWIG) 2001-2004
 Dean of Law, 2003–2004
 Member of Council 1995-continues

Research 
He has published extensively in the field of Property Law generally, and Commercial Property, Landlord and Tenant and Commonhold in particular

External examining 
Periods as external examiner for: the University of Cambridge; University of Durham; University of Hull; University of Sheffield; University of Keele; University College London; Queen's University, Belfast; Newcastle University and the University of Law.

Community activities 
 Governor of Westbury Park Primary School, 1992–1996
 Governor of Cotham Grammar School, 1992–2000, Vice Chair of Governors, 1994–1996, Chair of Governors, 1996–1997. Trustee of Redland Chapel Charitable Trust.
 Clarke purchased Bark at 'Ee, part of the Gromit Unleashed sculpture collection, for £20,000. The oversized stuffed dog is displayed at the Willis Memorial Building on the Bristol University campus.

References

Sources
 Deputy Vice-Chancellor, Professor David Clarke

Academics of the University of Bristol
English lawyers
Living people
Year of birth missing (living people)
Alumni of Queens' College, Cambridge